Garbage Dreams is a 2009 feature length documentary film produced and directed by Mai Iskander.  Filmed over the course of four years, Garbage Dreams follows three teenage boys growing up in Egypt's garbage village. Garbage Dreams aired on the PBS program Independent Lens for the occasion of Earth Day 2010 and has been screened in many international film festivals.

Synopsis

Garbage Dreams follows three teenage boys born into the trash trade and growing up in the world's largest garbage village, on the outskirts of Cairo, Egypt. It is the home to 60,000 Zaballeen, also spelled "Zabbaleen" as Arabic for "garbage people." Far ahead of any modern "Green" initiatives, the Zaballeen survive by recycling 80 percent of the garbage they collect. When their community is suddenly faced with the globalization of its trade, each of the teenage boys is forced to make choices that will impact his future and the survival of his community.

Release
Garbage Dreams premiered at the 2009 SXSW Film Festival, where it ran in the US Documentary Competition Garbage Dreams had its international premiere in Europe at the twenty-second International Documentary Film Festival Amsterdam
and its Middle Eastern premiere at the Dubai International Film Festival.

Garbage Dreams was shortlisted for the 2010 Academy Awards in the category of Best Feature Length Documentary, was nominated for the 2010 Best Documentary by the Directors Guild of America, and has won 26 international awards including the Al Gore Reel Current Award  and IDA Humanitas Award.

Garbage Dreams aired on PBS Independent Lens for the occasion of Earth Day 2010. It has been screened in over 100 international film festivals, including the Woodstock Film Festival, the Hollywood Film Festival, the Bel Air Film Festival, Maryland Film Festival, and the Seattle International Film Festival.

Critical reception
Former U.S. Vice President Al Gore presented the 2009 REEL Current Award to the documentary Garbage Dreams at the Nashville Film Festival. Gore, and the writer of An Inconvenient Truth, presents the award annually to a film that gives outstanding insight into a contemporary global issue.

Gore said of the film, "Garbage Dreams is a moving story of young men searching for a ways to eke out a living for their families and facing tough choices as they try to do the right thing for the planet. Mai Iskander guides us into a 'garbage village', a place so different from our own, and yet the choices they face there are so hauntingly familiar. Ultimately, Garbage Dreams makes a compelling case that modernization does not always equal progress."

In Variety Ronnie Scheib called the film "Stunning debut ...  [Iskander's] lensing grants her subjects immense dignity (they never appear "other" in their poverty) and her film its curious beauty."

In her review in The New York Times, Jeannette Catsoulis said "Expertly weaving personal fears, family tensions and political action, 'Garbage Dreams' records the tremblings of a culture at a crossroads."

In The Hollywood Reporter Frank Scheck wrote "Championed by Oscar winner Al Gore and the spur for a million-dollar donation by the Bill and Melinda Gates Foundation, Garbage Dreams  could ride its sociological importance to Oscar recognition."

In The Village Voice Andrew Schenker called Garbage Dreams a "handsomely shot and intermittently fascinating look at Cairo's Zaballeen community."

Awards
 Al Gore REEL Current Award 2009 (winner) at the Nashville Film Festival
 Humanitas Award 2009 (winner) at the International Documentary Association Documentary Awards
 Best Documentary 2009 (winner) at the Hollywood Film Festival
 Best Documentary 2009 (winner) at the Lone Star Film Festival
 Best Documentary 2009 (winner) at the Landlocked Film Festival
 Best Documentary 2009 (winner) at the Bermuda International Film Festival
 Best Documentary 2009 (winner) at the Vail Film Festival
 Best Documentary 2010 (winner)  Ashland Independent Film Festival
 Best International Film 2010 (winner)  Santa Cruz Film Festival
 Best Editing 2009 (winner) at the Woodstock Film Festival
 Golden Palm 2009 (winner) at the Mexico International Film Festival
 Human Spirit Award 2009 (winner) at the Ojai-Ventura Film Festival
 Best Cinematography 2009 (winner) at the Rhode Island International Film Festival
 Best Green 2009 (winner) at the Connecticut Film Festival
 World Cinema Best Director 2009 (winner) at the Phoenix Film Festival
 World Cinema Audience Award 2009 (winner) at the Phoenix Film Festival
 Silver Screen Award 2009 (winner) at the Nevada Film Festival
 Jury Award (winner), Merit Award for Awareness (winner), Merit Award for Cultural Message (winner), Merit Award for Educational Value (winner) at the 2009 Montana Cine International Film Festival
 Special Jury Prize for Muhr Arab Feature Documentary (winner) Dubai International Film Festival
 Special Jury Award (winner)  Sebastopol FIlm Festival
 Tornio Provincial Special Award (winner)  Cinemambiente
 Youth Prize, Special Mention (winner)  Squardi Altrove
 Nominated for the Outstanding Directorial Achievement in Documentaries (winner) Directors Guild of America Award
 Best Feature Length Film (winner) Eco Films Rodos
 Green Doc Award (winner) Dokufest Kosovo Film Festival
 Shortlisted for Academy Award Documentary Feature 2009

See also
 Marina of the Zabbaleen

References

External links
  official website
 
 Garbage Dreams at PBS
 Garbage Dreams at Rotten Tomatoes

2009 films
2000s English-language films
2000s Arabic-language films
2009 documentary films
Waste management
American documentary films
Squatting in film
2009 multilingual films
American multilingual films
2000s American films